Nannestad is a surname. Notable people with the surname include:

Elizabeth Nannestad (born 1956), New Zealand poet
Frederik Nannestad (1693–1774), Norwegian theologian, author, and bishop
Katrina Nannestad, Australian children's writer
Mathias Bonsach Krogh Nannestad (1815–1878), Norwegian civil servant and politician
Rolf Nannestad (1887–1969), Norwegian actor